The 1984 Metro Conference men's basketball tournament was held March 8–10 at the Mid-South Coliseum in Memphis, Tennessee. 

Memphis State defeated  in the championship game, 78–65, to win their second Metro men's basketball tournament.

The Tigers received the conference's automatic bid to the 1984 NCAA Tournament. Additionally, Louisville received an at-large bid.

Format
All eight members of the conference participated. Teams were seeded based on regular season conference records. This was the first tournament for South Carolina, who joined the Metro Conference after playing as an Independent.

Bracket

References

Metro Conference men's basketball tournament
Tournament
Metro Conference men's basketball tournament
Metro Conference men's basketball tournament